Różana may refer to the following places:

Poland
 Różana, Środa Śląska County, Lower Silesian Voivodeship
 Różana, Wałbrzych County, Lower Silesian Voivodeship
 Różana, Ząbkowice Śląskie County, Lower Silesian Voivodeship

Belarus
 Ruzhany (Polish: Różana), Brest Region
 Ruzhany Palace